1103 Sequoia is a bright Hungaria asteroid from the innermost region of the asteroid belt, approximately  in diameter. It was discovered on 9 November 1928, by German astronomer Walter Baade at the Bergedorf Observatory in Hamburg, Germany, who named it after the Sequoia National Park located in California.

Orbit and classification 

Sequoia is a bright member of the Hungaria family, a large family within the larger dynamical Hungaria group that forms the innermost dense concentration of asteroids in the Solar System. It orbits the Sun at a distance of 1.8–2.1 AU once every 2 years and 8 months (982 days; semi-major axis of 1.93 AU). Its orbit has an eccentricity of 0.09 and an inclination of 18° with respect to the ecliptic.

The body's observation arc begins at the North African Algiers Observatory in December 1928, about 7 weeks after its official discovery observation at Bergedorf.

Physical characteristics 

In the Tholen classification and based on observations by the Wide-field Infrared Survey Explorer (WISE), Sequoia is a bright E-type asteroid, which is the predominant type for members of the Hungaria family, while in the SMASS classification, it is a Xk-subtype that transitions between the X- and K-type asteroids.

Rotation period 

A large number of rotational lightcurves of Sequoia have been obtained from photometric observations since 1990. Best rated lightcurve by Italian amateur astronomer Silvano Casulli from December 2006 gave a rotation period of 3.03784 hours with a brightness amplitude of 0.44 magnitude.

Poles 

Sequoias lightcurve has also been modeled several times and gave a concurring sidereal period of 3.03797, 3.037976 and 3.037977 hours. In 2016, the large collaboration of astronomers also published a spin axis of (60.0°, −59.0°) in ecliptic coordinates (λ, β).

Diameter and albedo 

According to the surveys carried out by the Japanese Akari satellite and the NEOWISE mission of NASA's WISE telescope, Sequoia measures between 5.21 and 7.816 kilometers in diameter and its surface has an albedo between 0.2813 and 0.823.

The Collaborative Asteroid Lightcurve Link adopts Petr Pravec's revised WISE results, that is, an albedo of 0.2813 and a diameter of 7.82 kilometers based on an absolute magnitude of 12.53.

Naming 

This minor planet was named after the Sequoia National Park located in California, United States, where the discoverer spent his vacations. The park is famous for its giant sequoia trees. The official naming citation was mentioned in The Names of the Minor Planets by Paul Herget in 1955.

Notes

References

External links 
 Lightcurve Database Query (LCDB), at www.minorplanet.info
 Dictionary of Minor Planet Names, Google books
 Asteroids and comets rotation curves, CdR – Geneva Observatory, Raoul Behrend
 Discovery Circumstances: Numbered Minor Planets (1)-(5000) – Minor Planet Center
 
 

001103
Discoveries by Walter Baade
Named minor planets
001103
001103
19281109